Our Own may refer to:
 Our Own (2004 film), a Russian action drama film
 Our Own (2020 film), a Canadian drama film